Acalyptris krugeri is a moth of the family Nepticulidae. It was described by Vári in 1963. It is known from South Africa (it was described from Kruger National Park).

The larvae feed on Schotia brachypetala.

References

Nepticulidae
Endemic moths of South Africa
Moths described in 1963